The 2021 OpTic Chicago season is the second season for NRG Esports in the Call of Duty League. It was announced on November 11, 2020 that this would be the first season under the brand of OpTic Chicago after the Chicago Huntsmen re-branded when CEO Hector "HECZ" Rodriguez regained the intellectual property of OpTic Gaming.

The league season was re-structured moving into the 2021 season with the regular season now consisting of five stages which all would culminate with a major tournament. Each major would include all 12 teams with teams split into 2 groups of six. Teams would then compete against the five teams in their group to determine seeding for the stage ending major tournament.

Preceding offseason 
The team announced on September 7 and 8, 2020 that Pierce "Gunless" Hillman, Alec "Arcitys" Sanderson, and Preston "Prestinni" Sanderson left the team. Gunless and Prestinni later joined the Seattle Surge while Arcitys joined the Atlanta FaZe.

On September 14, 2020 it was announced that OpTic Gaming Los Angeles player Brandon "Dashy" Otell joined Seth "Scump" Abner", Matthew "FormaL" Piper, and Dylan "Envoy" Hannon to make up the starting roster as the CDL announced the league returned to 4v4.

Overview

Kickoff Classic 
On January 24, the CDL opened the season with the Kickoff Classic that had 6 matches that were all voted on by the fans. With 89.7% of the vote, the fans voted for OpTic to face former player Matthew "Nadeshot" Haag's franchise the LA Thieves. OpTic won that match 3–0.

Stage 1 

Prior to their match in the Kickoff Classic it was revealed that the Dallas Empire sent OpTic to Group B for Stage 1. Group B included the Atlanta FaZe, Florida Mutineers, Los Angeles Guerrillas, Paris Legion, and Toronto Ultra. Stage 1 was initially planned to consist of 3 home series on February 11–14, 18–21, and 25–28, however as a result of the Texas power crisis the final two weeks were condensed into a super week. It concluded with the Stage 1 Major happening on March 1–7.

As a result of their 4–1 record in Stage 1, OpTic Chicago finished second in the Group B standings and qualified for the Winner's Bracket at the Major. At the major the team finished with a 2–2 record ultimately placing 4th overall.

Stage 2 
The Stage 2 groups were announced via the Call of Duty League's YouTube on 12 March. Atlanta FaZe sent OpTic to Group B for Stage 2. Group B also included the Dallas Empire, Florida Mutineers, Paris Legion, Minnesota Rokkr and Seattle Surge. Stage 2 consisted of the Toronto Ultra home series on March 18–21, Week 2 on March 25–28 and the Los Angeles Guerillas home series on April 1–4. It concluded with the Stage 2 Major on April 5–11.

After finishing Stage 2 with a 3–2 record, the same record as Minnesota ROKKR and Dallas Empire, OpTic Chicago were subsequently seeded 2nd from Group B as a result of tiebreakers qualifying for the Winner's Bracket at the Major. At the major the team finished with a 1–2 record, placing them tied for 5th with Los Angeles Thieves.

Stage 3 
The Stage 3 groups were announced via the Call of Duty League's YouTube on 16 April. Toronto Ultra sent OpTic to Group B for Stage 3. Group B also included the Atlanta FaZe, Los Angeles Thieves, New York Subliners, Seattle Surge and London Royal Ravens. Stage 3 consisted of the London Royal Ravens home series on April 22–25, Paris Legion home series April 29- May 2 and the Dallas Empire home series May 6–9. It concluded with the Stage 3 Major in the week of May 10.

After finishing Stage 3 with a 2–3 record, OpTic Chicago were seeded 4th from Group B and were placed in the Loser's Bracket at the Major. At the major the team finished with a 3–1 record, placing them 4th overall.

Stage 4 
The Stage 4 groups were announced via the Call of Duty League's YouTube on 22 May. New York Subliners sent OpTic to Group A for Stage 4. Group A also included the Atlanta FaZe, Los Angeles Thieves, Minnesota ROKKR, Seattle Surge and Paris Legion. Stage 4 consisted of the OpTic Chicago home series on May 27–30, Florida Mutineers home series June 3–6 and the Los Angeles Thieves home series June 10–13. It concluded with the Stage 4 Major on June 17–20.

After finishing Stage 4 with a 3–2 record, OpTic Chicago were seeded 2nd from Group A and were placed in the Winners's Bracket at the Major. At the major the team finished with a 2–2 record, placing them 4th overall.

Stage 5 
The Stage 5 groups were announced via the Call of Duty League's YouTube on 25 June. Dallas Empire sent OpTic to Group A for Stage 5. Group A also included the Atlanta FaZe, Los Angeles Thieves, New York Subliners, London Royal Ravens and Paris Legion. Stage 4 consisted of the New York Subliners home series on July 8–11, Minnesota ROKKR home series July 15–18 and the Seattle Surge home series July 22–25. It will conclude with the Stage 5 Major on July 29–1 August, which will see the return of fans in attendance for the first time since February 2020 as a result of the COVID-19 pandemic.

After finishing Stage 5 with a 4–1 record, OpTic Chicago were seeded 1st from Group A and were placed in the Winners's Bracket at the Major with a first round bye.

Roster

Standings

Game log

Preseason

Regular season

Post season

References

Call of Duty League seasons by team